The Zhongxing Admiral is a mid-size sport utility vehicle and pick-up produced by the Chinese manufacturer ZX Auto and sold throughout the world from 2000 to 2010. The original model was launched in 2000 and sold till 2004 with an extensive facelift introduced in 2005 as the second generation model, and a spawned pick-up variant called the Grand Tiger introduced in 2007.

Overview
The Zhongxing Admiral was built on a platform based on the platform of the sixth generation Toyota Hilux. The platform was produced under a license deal with Toyota. The engine of the Admiral is also sourced from Toyota, which is a 2.2 liter 491Q-ME petrol engine producing 102hp and 193nm. The engine was mated to a five-speed manual transmission. Top speed of the Admiral was 130 km/h and 0-100 km/hr acceleration takes 11 seconds.

The Admiral SUV and pick-up was launched in 2000. The SUV models at launch has a top trim level high end variant featuring a hood scoop, a differently styled front bumper, extended wheel arches, chrome mirror covers, and factory white wall tires. The interior is equipped with electric windows, a CD player, optional faux-leather seats and a rear-seat entertainment system with two DVD screens. Only only rear-wheel drive is available.

The vehicle’s designation of the Zhongxing Admiral starts with BQ6472. BQ was the vehicle code for the Zhongxing brand. 6742 was the code for the Admiral. An additional last three digits is different depending on the variant.

2005 facelift
In 2005 the Admiral received a facelift and was considered to be the second generation model by ZX Auto which was then called the Admiral II. The Admiral II is available with a 4WD version, and was sold from 2005 till 2010.

Zhongxing Grand Tiger

In 2007 the Admiral pick-up received another facelift and became a standalone model renamed to Zhongxing Grand Tiger. Only the pick-up variant is still in production.

References

External links 

All-wheel-drive vehicles
Cars introduced in 2000
Cars discontinued in 2010
Mid-size sport utility vehicles
Rear-wheel-drive vehicles
Cars of China
2000s cars